Meyrick Whitmore Payne (10 May 1885 – 2 June 1963) was an English first-class cricketer, active 1904–29, who played for Middlesex County Cricket Club.

References

1885 births
1963 deaths
English cricketers
Middlesex cricketers
Marylebone Cricket Club cricketers
Cambridge University cricketers
Gentlemen cricketers
North v South cricketers
Gentlemen of England cricketers
Free Foresters cricketers